Missaglia is an Italian surname. Notable people with the surname include:

Antonio Missaglia (1416/1417–1495/1496), Italian armourer
 (1930–1996), Italian cartoonist
Gabriele Missaglia (born 1970), Italian cyclist

Italian-language surnames